= Umayyads =

Umayyads may refer to:

- Umayyad dynasty, a Muslim ruling family of the Caliphate (661–750) and in Iberia (756–1031)
- Umayyad Caliphate (661–750)
- Umayyad state of Córdoba (756–1031)
  - Emirate of Córdoba (756–929)
  - Caliphate of Córdoba (929–1031)
